The 5th 3Music Awards was held on 26 March 2022 at the Grand Arena of the Accra International Conference Centre, in Accra to recognize the works of artists in the year under review. It was broadcast by TV3, 3MUSIC TV, DGN and HD +. The ceremony's theme was ''More Than Music'', and was held in-person with an audience following the previous year's virtual ceremony.

The nominees were announced on 15 February 2022 during a ceremony at the Teelande Tea Garden in Accra, Ghana. Kuami Eugene received the most nominations with 16, followed by Sarkodie who had 13 and KiDi who received 10 nominations.

On 14 March, Boomplay was announced as an official partner of the awards. The media steaming service sponsored three main categories of the awards; The Artiste of the Year, African Song of the Year and Breakthrough Act of the Year.

The artist of the year was won by KiDi for the second consecutive year.

Performances

Hosts

Winners and nominees 
This is the list of winners for the 3Music Awards in 2022.

See more 

 Red carpet photos

References

External links 

 Official website
 3Music Awards 2022 on Facebook
 3Music Awards 2022 on Twitter

African music awards